Odighizuwa is a surname. Notable people with the surname include:

Osa Odighizuwa (born 1998), American football player
Owa Odighizuwa (born 1992), American football player
Peter Odighizuwa, Nigerian-American convicted murderer

Surnames of African origin